Football National League may refer to:
Football National League, the organization managing the Russian National Football League
National League (English football), an English football League
National Football League, an American football league